Ghela'elo Subregion (Ghelalo Subregion) is a subregion in the Northern Red Sea region (Zoba Semienawi Keyih Bahri) of Eritrea. Its capital lies at Ghela'elo (Ghelalo).

References

Subregions of Eritrea

Northern Red Sea Region
Subregions of Eritrea